Robert Waddington may refer to:
Robert Waddington (priest)  (1927–2007), British Anglican priest
Robert Waddington (mathematician) (died 1779), mathematician, astronomer and teacher of navigation
Robert Waddington (politician), British MP